A marten is a weasel-like mammal in the genus Martes within the subfamily Guloninae, in the family Mustelidae. They have bushy tails and large paws with partially retractile claws. The fur varies from yellowish to dark brown, depending on the species; it is valued by animal trappers for the fur trade. Martens are slender, agile animals, adapted to living in the taiga, which inhabit coniferous and northern deciduous forests across the Northern Hemisphere.

Classification
Results of DNA research indicate that the genus Martes is paraphyletic, with some studies placing Martes americana outside the genus and allying it with Eira and Gulo, to form a new New World clade. The genus first evolved up to seven million years ago during the Miocene epoch.

Fossils
Several fossil martens have been described, including:
†Martes campestris (Pliocene)
†Martes wenzensis (Pliocene)
†Martes vetus (Pleistocene)

Another described fossil species, Martes nobilis from the Holocene, is now considered synonymous with the American marten.

Etymology
Old English , Old Norse , and Old High German and Yiddish  .

Ecology and behaviour

Martens are solitary animals, meeting only to breed in late spring or early summer. Litters of up to five blind and nearly hairless kits are born in early spring. They are weaned after around two months, and leave the mother to fend for themselves at about three to four months of age.
They are omnivorous.

Spatial niche segregation
It can be seen that there is a spatial niche segregation between certain species of marten such as the stone marten and the pine marten, however, we cannot credit this segregation to competition between the two species. It is more so due to the disparities in the two species' food preferences, avoidance of heavy predator pressure, and adaptability to cold climates that the spatial niche segregation occurs.

Cultural references

Canada 
The marten is populous in the northern Ontario community of Big Trout Lake. During the fur trade, commissioned by the Hudson Bay Company in the 18th and 19th centuries, the marten pelt was typically fashioned into mittens. The marten is still traded locally. The locals place a high value on this pelt, typically trading it for  consumable goods.

Croatia
In the Middle Ages, marten pelts were highly valued goods used as a form of payment in Slavonia, the Croatian Littoral, and Dalmatia. The marturina was a form of tax named after this. The banovac, a coin struck and used between 1235 and 1384, included the image of a marten. This is one of the reasons why the Croatian word for marten, kuna, was the name of the former Croatian currency. A marten is depicted on the obverse of the 1-, 2-, and 5-kuna coins, minted since 1993, and on the reverse of the 25-kuna commemorative coins. With adoption of euro as the national currency in 2023, a marten continues to be depicted on the obverse of the Croatian 1 euro coin.

A running marten is shown on the coat of arms of Slavonia and subsequently on the modern design of the coat of arms of Croatia. The official seal of the Croatian Sabor (parliament) from 1497 until the late 18th century had a similar design.

Finland
The Finnish communications company Nokia derives its name, via the river Nokianvirta, from a type of marten locally known as the nokia.

Greece 
In the Illiad, the fleet-footed spy Dolon wore a marten-pelt cap.

Italy 
The Latin word for helmet, galea, originally meant "marten pelt," although it is unclear whether early Romans wore these helmets for symbolical reasons or for their fine fur.

References

External links 
 
 

 
Mammals of Asia
Mammals of Canada
Carnivorans of Europe
Mammals of North America
Extant Miocene first appearances